James Arvaluk (April 1948 –  April 27, 2016) was a Canadian politician from Coral Harbour, Nunavut. He served as a member of the Legislative Assembly of Northwest Territories from 1991 to 1995 and a member of the Legislative Assembly of Nunavut from 1999 to 2003. He served as Nunavut's first Minister of Education.

Political career
In February 1995 Arvaluk resigned his seat in the NWT Legislative Assembly after being charged with sexual assault. He was convicted of two sexual assaults and sentenced to five years. However, after a successful appeal on one of the two counts he was required to serve only two and a half years.

On June 20, 2003 he resigned his seat after being convicted of assault causing bodily harm against his girlfriend in August 2000, for which he served nine months.

Had he not resigned, the Legislative Assembly was prepared to meet in an emergency session and pass a motion forcing him to leave.

At the October 16, 2006 by-election, Arvaluk was elected to the Legislative Assembly representing the Tununiq electoral district. After suffering both a heart attack and a stroke in 2010, he resigned his post on May 16, 2011, citing health reasons. He died in Winnipeg on April 27, 2016.

References

1948 births
2016 deaths
Inuit from the Northwest Territories
Members of the Legislative Assembly of Nunavut
21st-century Canadian politicians
Members of the Legislative Assembly of the Northwest Territories
People from Coral Harbour
Inuit politicians
Inuit from Nunavut
Nunavut candidates for Member of Parliament